Danburg may refer to:

Danburg, Georgia, an unincorporated community in Wilkes County, Georgia, United States
Debra Danburg, American politician